High School "Nace Bugjoni" is in Kumanovo, North Macedonia.

Formation and development

Student Staff 
At DSTU "Nace Bugjoni" are being educated the following staff off :
 Mechanical craft
 Technician for computer management- IV years
 Machine-energy technician- IV year
 Mechanic- III- year
 Electric technician
 Electro technician-energetician- IV year
 Electro technician for computer technology and automation- IV year
 Electrician-GTZ –III- год
 Health profession 
 Health profession- IV year

References

External links 
 http://nacebugjoni.mk/category/pocetna/ Official web page 
 https://web.archive.org/web/20090409125242/http://nacebudjoni_al.schools.edu.mk/ Alternative web page
 Portal of elementary schools and high schools
 Official web page of Ministry of education and science of North Macedonia

Buildings and structures in Kumanovo